John Joseph McGuire (August 25, 1917, in Altoona, Pennsylvania – August 1, 1981) was an American author of science fiction.

He frequently wrote with H. Beam Piper.

Selected works

Short Stories
 "Hunter Patrol" (Amazing May 1959)
 "The Return"    (Astounding January 1954) Note: an expanded version of this story can be found in "The Science Fictional Sherlock Holmes" (Council of Four, 1960)
 "The Queen's Messenger" (Astounding May 1957)
 "Trap for the Bleeder" (Fantastic Universe March 1959)
 "To Catch an Alien" in Star Science Fiction #6 (Ballantine Books 1959)
 "Take The Reason Prisoner" (Analog November 1963)
 "Testing" (Fantastic Stories June 1964)

Novels
 Null-ABC (Astounding February and March 1953) Note: also published as "Crisis in 2140" (Ace 1957)
 Lone Star Planet (Fantastic Universe March 1957) Note: also published as "A Planet for Texans" (Ace 1958)

References

External links 
 
 
 
 

20th-century American novelists
American male novelists
American male short story writers
American science fiction writers
1917 births
1981 deaths
20th-century American short story writers
20th-century American male writers